A number of steamships have been named Cattaro, including 
, an Italian and German auxiliary cruiser in service 1941–44
, a German cargo ship in service 1922–30
, a British cargo ship

Ship names